Houska is traditional bread roll baked and consumed in the Czech Republic. Typical ingredients include wheat flour (but other types can be used), water, yeast and salt. They are topped with poppy seeds, caraway seeds, linseeds or sea salt. Rohlík is another form, similar or identical by  ingredients, production, taste, size and price.  

A 2002 article in the Chicago Tribune published a recipe for a sweet variant, a lightly sweetened, traditional bread roll
 containing a significant amount of sugar, eggs and cream, occasionally raisins, and may be covered in poppy seeds.

See also
 List of bread rolls

References 

Czech cuisine